Stephen Joseph "Steve" Wooldridge (born 18 July 1950) is an English former footballer who played as a full-back in the Football League for Plymouth Argyle on loan from Crystal Palace, and Colchester United.

Career

Born in Chiswick, London, Wooldridge signed professional terms at Selhurst Park in July 1967 but failed to progress to the first-team. He was loaned out to Plymouth Argyle in the 1970–71 season where he made 20 Football League appearances.

Wooldridge was brought to Colchester United by manager Dick Graham in the summer of 1972, but after making his debut on the opening day of the season in a 1–0 win against Hereford United, he featured on just two further occasions for the club following the resignation of manager Graham. He made his final appearance for the club on 20 September 1972 in a 1–0 away defeat at Southport before being loaned out to Folkestone in November, signing permanently just before Christmas.

References

1950 births
Living people
Footballers from Chiswick
English footballers
Association football fullbacks
Crystal Palace F.C. players
Plymouth Argyle F.C. players
Colchester United F.C. players
Folkestone F.C. players
English Football League players